Göran or Jöran (both pronounced ) is the Swedish form of George, not to be confused with the Slavic Goran.

Notable people with the name include:
Göran Andersson, Swedish sport sailor
Göran Bror Benny Andersson Swedish musician, composer, and member of the group ABBA
Sven-Göran Eriksson, Swedish football coach
Göran Folkestad, Swedish musician
Göran Gentele, Swedish actor
Göran Gunnarsson, Swedish lieutenant general
Göran Hägglund, Swedish politician, former leader of the Christian Democrats
Jöran Hägglund, Swedish politician, secretary of the Centre party
Göran Högosta, Swedish ice hockey player
Göran Johansson, Swedish politician, mayor of Gothenburg
Göran Kropp, Swedish adventurer and mountaineer
Göran Lagerberg, Swedish musician
Göran Lennmarker, Swedish politician
Göran Magnusson (1939–2010), Swedish politician
Göran Malmqvist, Swedish linguist, literary historian
Göran Mårtensson, Swedish Army lieutenant general
Göran Söllscher, Swedish classical guitarist
Göran Persson Swedish prime minister (1996–2006)
Jöran Persson, Swedish official during the 16th century

Swedish masculine given names